Marimuthu is an Indian name. It may refer to
Given name
Marimuthu Bharathan (born 1961), Indian human rights activist
Marimuthu Muniandy (born 1971),  Malaysian cricketer
Marimuthu Palaniswami, Australian computer scientist
M. Yoganathan (Marimuthu Yoganathan, born 1969), Indian environmental activist

Surname
A. Marimuthu, Indian politician 
T. Marimuthu, Indian politician 
A. R. Marimuthu, Indian politician 
Gomathi Marimuthu, Indian track and field sprinter
Moo. Marimuthu, Indian politician 
M. Marimuthu, Indian politician 
M. Marimuthu (Thanjavur MLA), Indian politician
G. Marimuthu,Indian Tamil film director